Jaclyn Marie Dowaliby (May 17, 1981 – September 10, 1988) was an American girl who disappeared from her bedroom during the night in Cook County, Illinois, United States. The murdered child's body was found four days later.

Disappearance
On September 10, 1988, seven-year-old Jaclyn was taken from her home in Midlothian, Illinois, United States, at some point during the night. The next morning, her mother Cynthia Dowaliby reported her as a missing child, possibly an abduction, and said that she "prayed for her return". Police reportedly found a broken window, but it may have been a faked break-in as her adoptive father David Dowaliby later recalled the back door was left open. Search parties were organized, but for four days Jaclyn was nowhere to be found.

Death and legacy
Although an autopsy could not reveal when she had been killed, the police suspected that Cynthia and David were involved in the crime. In 1990 they were put on trial for her murder. Cynthia was acquitted but David was convicted on eyewitness testimony which placed him at the scene where her body was found. In October 1991, an appellate court overturned his conviction, ruling that there was no more evidence against him than there had been against Cynthia. On November 13, 1991, David Dowaliby was released from prison. Nobody else has been arrested or convicted for her murder.

In popular culture
The Dowaliby case was featured on NBC's Unsolved Mysteries on November 18, 1992. It featured interviews with the Dowalibys, along with the investigators and defense attorneys involved in the case.

In 1996, a television film was released, entitled Gone in the Night. It was based on Jaclyn Dowaliby's disappearance and murder, and starred Kevin Dillon and Shannen Doherty as David and Cynthia. The film ended with the real David and Cynthia in a PSA for the National Center for Missing and Exploited Children.

American Justice did an episode on the case.

The podcast series, The Shattered Window, covers the case.

See also
Crime in Illinois
List of solved missing person cases
List of unsolved murders

References

External links
National Center for Missing and Exploited Children

1980s crimes in Illinois
1980s missing person cases
1988 in Illinois
1988 murders in the United States
1990s trials
Cook County, Illinois
Deaths by person in Illinois
Formerly missing people
Kidnapped American children
Kidnapping in the 1980s
Kidnappings in the United States
Missing person cases in Illinois
Murder in Illinois
Murder trials
Overturned convictions in the United States
September 1988 crimes
September 1988 events in the United States
Trials in the United States
Unsolved murders in the United States
Female murder victims
Incidents of violence against girls
Murdered American children